Caramel corn or caramel popcorn (toffee popcorn in the UK) is a confection made of popcorn coated with a sugar or molasses based caramel candy shell that is normally less than 1mm thick. Typically a sugar solution or syrup is made and heated until it browns and becomes thick, producing a caramelized candy syrup. This hot candy is then mixed with popped popcorn, and allowed to cool. Sometimes, a candy thermometer is used, as making caramel is time-consuming and requires skill to make well without burning the sugar. The process creates a sweet flavored, crunchy snack food or treat. Some varieties, after coating with the candy syrup, are baked in an oven to crisp the mixture. Mixes of caramel corn sometimes contain nuts, such as peanuts, pecans, almonds, or cashews.

History
The combination of caramel and corn dates back at least as far as the 1890s with the strong molasses flavor of Cracker Jack, an early version of which was introduced at the Chicago World's Fair in 1893. The lighter, sweet but un-caramelized kettle corn, may be a North American Colonial predecessor to caramel corn.

There are many commercial brands and forms of caramel corn available, such as Cracker Jack, Fiddle Faddle, Lolly Gobble Bliss Bombs, and Crunch 'n Munch. In grocery stores, at cinemas, and convenience stores, pre-bagged caramel corn made locally may also be sold.

Regulation 
Candy-coated popcorn is defined in US law as a food of minimal nutritional value.

See also

Cretors, the Chicago company who invented the first commercial popcorn machine
Kettle corn, the sweetened popcorn with a lighter, thinner (in both flavor and color) sweet coating

References 

Confectionery
Popcorn
Halloween food